Ilayangudi Higher Secondary School is school located at Ilayangudi in Sivaganga, Tamil Nadu, India

External links

See also
 List of schools in India

High schools and secondary schools in Tamil Nadu
Education in Sivaganga district